Punjabi culture grew out of the settlements along the five rivers (the name Punjab, is derived from two Persian words, Panj meaning "Five" and Âb meaning "Water") which served as an important route to the Near East as early as the ancient Indus Valley civilization, dating back to 3000 BCE. Agriculture has been the major economic feature of the Punjab and has therefore formed the foundation of Punjabi culture, with one's social status being determined by landownership. The Punjab emerged as an important agricultural region, especially following the Green Revolution during the mid-1960's to the mid-1970's, has been described as the "breadbasket of both India and Pakistan". Besides being known for agriculture and trade, the Punjab is also a region that over the centuries has experienced many foreign invasions and consequently has a long-standing history of warfare, as the Punjab is situated on the principal route of invasions through the northwestern frontier of the Indian subcontinent, which promoted to adopt a lifestyle that entailed engaging in warfare to protect the land. Warrior culture typically elevates the value of the community's honour (izzat), which is highly esteemed by Punjabis.

Music

Bhangra is one of the many Punjabi musical art forms that are increasingly listened to in the West and becoming a mainstream favourite. Punjabi music is used by western musicians in many ways, such as mixing with other compositions to produce award-winning music. Sufi music and Qawali, commonly practiced in Pakistani Punjab; are other important genres in the Punjab region.

Dance

Punjabi dances are performed either by men or by women. The dances range from solo to group dances and also sometimes dances are done along with traditional musical instruments. Bhangra is one of the most famous dances originating in the Punjab by farmers during the harvesting season. It was mainly performed while farmers did agricultural chores. As they did each farming activity they would perform bhangra moves on the spot. This allowed them to finish their job in a pleasurable way. For many years, farmers performed bhangra to showcase a sense of accomplishment and to welcome the new harvesting season. Traditional bhangra is performed in a circle and is performed using traditional dance steps. Traditional bhangra is now also performed on occasions other than during the harvest season.

Art

Weddings

Punjabi wedding traditions and ceremonies are traditionally conducted in Punjabi and are a strong reflection of Punjabi culture. While the actual religious marriage ceremony among Muslims, Hindus, Sikhs, Jains, Buddhists and Christians may be conducted in Arabic, Urdu, Punjabi, Sanskrit, Hindi or Pali by the Qazi, Pundit, Granthi or Priest, there are commonalities in ritual, song, dance, food, and dress. The Punjabi wedding has many rituals and ceremonies that have evolved since traditional times and itself have evolved in Pakistani Punjab and Indian Punjab.

Cuisine
Punjabi cuisine has a wide range of dishes and enjoys world wide popularity. Many entrepreneurs have built large personal fortunes by investing in the sector promoting Punjabi cuisine which uses a uniquely appealing spice palette. Punjabi cuisine has become popular in the world due, not only to its intrinsic quality, but also due to the Punjabi diaspora promoting popularity and visibility in the western world including the UK, and the U.S. Some of the most popular dishes include Butter Chicken, Tandoori chicken, Dal makhni, chicken tikka lababdar, Saron da saag and stuffed or un stuffed naans (a type of unleavened bread).

Language and literature

The Punjabi language is written with the Gurmukhi alphabet in India and with the Shahmukhi alphabet in Pakistan. Approximately 130 million people speak the Punjabi language.
 
In Punjabi literature, there are three major Punjabi romantic epic poems based on folktales: Heer Ranjha by the poet Waris Shah (1722-1798), Sohni Mahiwal and Mirza Sahiban (sung by late Alam Lohar). By the 10th century, many Hindu Nath poets were associated with earlier Punjabi works. Among the major Punjabi poets are Baba Fariduddin Ganjshakar (1179-1266), Baba Guru Nanak (1469-1539) and Bulleh Shah (1680-1757).

Dress

Dastar

A Dastar is an proud of headgear associated with Sikhism and is an important part of the Punjabi and Sikh culture. Among the Sikhs, the dastār is an article of faith that represents equality, honour, self-respect, courage, spirituality, and piety. The Khalsa Sikh men and women, who keep the Five Ks, wear the turban to cover their long, uncut hair (kesh). The Sikhs regard the dastār as an important part of the unique Sikh identity. After the ninth Sikh Guru, Tegh Bahadur, was sentenced to death by the Mughal emperor Aurangzeb, Guru Gobind Singh, the tenth Sikh Guru created the Khalsa and gave five articles of faith, one of which is unshorn hair, which the dastār covers. Prior to Sikhi, only kings, royalty, and those of high stature wore turbans, but Sikh Gurus adopted the practice to assert equality and sovereignty among people.
Punjabi suit

A Punjabi suit that features two items - a qameez (top), salwar (bottom) is the traditional attire of the Punjabi people. Shalwars are trousers which are atypically wide at the waist but which narrow to a cuffed bottom. They are held up by a drawstring or elastic belt, which causes them to become pleated around the waist. The trousers can be wide and baggy, or they can be cut quite narrow, on the bias. The kameez is a long shirt or tunic. The side seams are left open below the waist-line (the opening known as the chaak), which gives the wearer greater freedom of movement. The kameez is usually cut straight and flat; older kameez use traditional cuts; modern kameez are more likely to have European-inspired set-in sleeves. The combination garment is sometimes called salwar kurta, salwar suit, or Punjabi suit. The shalwar-kameez is a widely-worn, and national dress, of Pakistan. When women wear the shalwar-kameez in some regions, they usually wear a long scarf or shawl called a dupatta around the head or neck. The dupatta is also employed as a form of modesty—although it is made of delicate material, it obscures the upper body's contours by passing over the shoulders. For Muslim women, the dupatta is a less stringent alternative to the chador or burqa (see hijab and purdah); for Sikh and Hindu women, the dupatta is useful when the head must be covered, as in a temple or the presence of elders. Everywhere in South Asia, modern versions of the attire have evolved; the shalwars are worn lower down on the waist, the kameez have shorter length, with higher splits, lower necklines and backlines, and with cropped sleeves or without sleeves.

Festivals 
The Punjabi Muslims typically observe the Islamic festivals. The Punjabi Sikhs and Hindus typically do not observe these, and instead observe Lohri, Basant and Vaisakhi as seasonal festivals. The Punjabi Muslim festivals are set according to the lunar Islamic calendar (Hijri), and the date falls earlier by 10 to 13 days from year to year. The Hindu and Sikh Punjabi seasonal festivals are set on specific dates of the luni-solar Bikrami calendar or Punjabi calendar and the date of the festival also typically varies in the Gregorian calendar but stays within the same two Gregorian months.

Some Punjabi Muslims participate in the traditional, seasonal festivals of the Punjab region: Baisakhi, Basant and to a minor scale Lohri, but this is controversial. Islamic clerics and some politicians have attempted to ban this participation because of the religious basis of the Punjabi festivals, and they being declared haram (forbidden in Islam).

See also

Punjabi Culture Day
Punjabi calendar
Punjabi festivals
Folk practices in Punjab
Punjab
Punjabi people
British Punjabis
Punjabi Americans
Punjabi Australians
Punjabi Canadians
Punjabi diaspora
Punjab (India)
Punjab (Pakistan)
Punjabi Cultural Society of Chicago
List of Punjabi language poets
Livestock show
Vaisakhi
Sikh art and culture

Notes

References

Other sources
Wrestling in Punjab, documentary film on the history of wrestling in Punjab by filmmaker Simran Kaler.
Quraishee 73, Punjabi Adab De Kahani, Abdul Hafeez Quaraihee, Azeez Book Depot, Lahore, 1973.
Chopra 77, The Punjab as a sovereign state, Gulshan Lal Chopra, Al-Biruni, Lahore, 1977.
Patwant Singh. 1999. The Sikhs. New York: Doubleday. .
 Nanak, Punjabi Documentary Film by Navalpreet Rangi
The evolution of Heroic Tradition in Ancient Panjab, 1971, Buddha Parkash.
Social and Political Movements in ancient Panjab, Delhi, 1962, Buddha Parkash.
History of Porus, Patiala, Buddha Parkash.
History of the Panjab, Patiala, 1976, Fauja Singh, L. M. Joshi (Ed).
The Legacy of The Punjab by R. M. Chopra, 1997, Punjabee Bradree, Calcutta.

External links
Video about Punjab and Punjabi music from the Horniman Museum

 
Punjab
Pakistani culture
Indian culture by community
History of Punjab